Zamani is a township near Memel in the Thabo Mofutsanyana District Municipality in Free State province of South Africa.

References 

Populated places in the Phumelela Local Municipality